FC Odra Petřkovice is a Czech football club located in the Petřkovice district of Ostrava. It currently plays in the Moravian–Silesian Football League, which is the third tier of Czech football.

Petřkovice won promotion to the MSFL in 2016, with two games left at the end of the 2016–17 season of the Czech Fourth Division. To mark 80 years of the club's existence, the club played a match against FC Baník Ostrava, winning 1–0 in September 2016.

Historical names 

 1936 – SK Petřkovice (Sportovní klub Petřkovice)
 1945 – TJ Sokol Petřkovice (Tělovýchovná jednota Sokol Petřkovice)
 1967 – TJ Vítězný únor Ostrava (Tělovýchovná jednota Vítězný únor Ostrava)
 1990 – HTJ Odra Ostrava (Hornická tělovýchovná jednota Odra Ostrava)
 1995 – FC Odra Petřkovice (Football Club Odra Petřkovice)

Czech Cup
The team reached the second round of the Czech Cup in 2017–18, defeating FK Bohumín 4–0 in the first round.

References

External links
 Official website 

Football clubs in the Czech Republic
Association football clubs established in 1936
Sport in Ostrava